Severe Tropical Cyclone Oscar was one of the worst tropical cyclones to affect Fiji. The system was first noted as a shallow depression on 23 February, while it was located to the north of Fiji's capital Suva. The system subsequently developed further as it moved westwards and was named as Tropical Cyclone Oscar during the next day. Over the next few days Oscar subsequently intensified as it moved westwards and gradually developed further and equivalent to a Category 3 severe tropical cyclone, on the modern day Australian tropical cyclone intensity scale during 27 February. The system subsequently turned and started to move south-eastwards towards Fiji.

Meteorological history

The system subsequently developed further as it moved westwards and was declared a tropical cyclone and named Oscar by the FMS during February 24. Over the next few days Oscar subsequently intensified as it moved westwards and gradually developed further. During 27 February, Oscar intensified into a Category 3 severe tropical cyclone as it started to move towards the south-east and Fiji. The system subsequently continued to intensify during that day with the eye appearing on satellite imagery, before it came into the range of the Nadi International Airport's radar at around 03:30 UTC (15:30 FST) on 28 February. The radar imagery showed that the system had an eye within a better defined and larger concentric eye and allowed the FMS to perform hourly fixes on the systems position. Later that day at 12:00 UTC (00:00 FST, 1 March), the FMS reported that the system had peaked with estimated 10-minute sustained wind speeds of 185 km/h (115 mph) which made it a Category 4 severe tropical cyclone. The United States Joint Typhoon Warning Center (JTWC) subsequently reported six hours later that the system had peaked with 1-minute sustained wind speeds of 185 km/h (115 mph), which made it equivalent to a category 3 hurricane on the Saffir-Simpson hurricane wind scale.

After wind gusts dropped and the pressure rose at Nadi, the radar was able to be brought back into operation at around 12:00 UTC (00:00 FST, 2 March). The radar's poor image suggested that Oscar was now located to the south of Sigatoka, having accelerated from  while the radar was shut down. Later that day the system wobbled towards the south-southeast, as it approached the island of Beqa, which spared the Fijian Capital of Suva from Oscar's worst effects. The system subsequently made landfall on the island of Kandavu at around 22:00 UTC (10:00 FST, 2 March), before it left the Fijian group of islands on 2 March.

Preparations and impact
As a result of the impact caused the name Oscar was retired, from the list of tropical cyclone names for the region. Ahead of a tropical cyclone alert for Fiji being issued on 27 February, local radio bulletins made Fijians aware that a tropical cyclone existed several days in advance. Gale, storm and hurricane warnings were subsequently issued for various parts of Fiji including Viti Levu, Kandavu and the Yasawa and Mamanutha island groups. Ahead of the system impacting the island nation, the Nadi International Airport was closed, with both internal and external flights cancelled. Schools around the nation were also closed with some being used as evacuation centres for the hundreds of Fijians who evacuated. On 28 February, the system started to affect Fiji with strong winds and light rain, before the wind and rain gradually became stronger the following day, with storm and hurricane-force winds recorded over the island nation.

Damage was mostly in the form of severe flooding from storm tides and torrential rains. Hardest hit areas included the Mamanutha Group, western and southwestern Viti Levu, and Yanutha, Vatulele, Kandevu and Mbengga Islands. In some areas storm surges reached 9 to 12 feet. However, the highest measured storm surge value was 5.93 m (19.46 ft)  at Rarawai Mill. Flooding due to torrential rains was particularly severe in western and southwestern Viti Levu. At Nadi Market flood levels were about 12 ft above the asphalt pavement. In the Singatoka Valley, which supplies most of Fiji's vegetables, most crops were destroyed as flooding reached levels beyond living memory of most people.

Aftermath
On 1 March, after the system had moved through the archipelago, the Fijian government immediately declared a national disaster and asked for assistance from the international community. Efforts to clean up certain towns including Nadi, Lautoka, Sigatoka and Suva started almost immediately after Oscar had moved away, with the Sigatoka Town council initiating a spraying campaign to destroy mosquitoes and counter an outbreak of disease.

See also

 Cyclone Evan
 Other storms of the same name

References

External links

1982–83 South Pacific cyclone season
1983 in Fiji
Category 5 South Pacific cyclones
Tropical cyclones in Fiji
Retired South Pacific cyclones
Oscar